Tradescantia pallida is a species of spiderwort (a genus of New World plants) similar to T. fluminensis and T. zebrina. The cultivar T. pallida 'Purpurea' is commonly called purple secretia, purple-heart, or purple queen. It is native to the Gulf Coast region of eastern Mexico. Edward Palmer collected the type specimen near Ciudad Victoria, Tamaulipas in 1907.

Names
The Latin specific epithet pallida means "pale".

Description
Tradescantia pallida is an evergreen perennial plant of scrambling stature.  It is distinguished by elongated, pointed leaves - themselves glaucous green, sometimes fringed with red or purple - and bearing small, sterile three-petaled flowers of white, pink or purple.  Plants are top-killed by moderate frosts, but will often sprout back from roots.

The cultivar T. pallida 'Purpurea' has purple leaves and pink flowers.

Cultivation
Widely used as an ornamental plant in gardens and borders, as a ground cover, hanging plant, or - particularly in colder climates where it cannot survive the winter season - houseplant, it is propagated easily by cuttings (the stems are visibly segmented and roots will frequently grow from the joints).

As a houseplant, T. pallida has been judged exceptionally effective at improving indoor air quality by filtering out volatile organic compounds, a class of common pollutants and respiratory irritants, an effect known as phytoremediation.

Numerous cultivars are available, of which 'Purpurea' with purple foliage has gained the Royal Horticultural Society's Award of Garden Merit.

Gallery

References

External links
 
 
 Purple heart, Wandering Jew at Desert Tropicals

pallida
Plants described in 1975
Flora of Tabasco
Flora of Tamaulipas
Flora of Veracruz
Flora of the Yucatán Peninsula
Medicinal plants
Garden plants of North America
House plants
Groundcovers
Phytoremediation plants